Ayesha Haroon (1977–2013) was a Pakistani journalist and writer. She worked as the editor of several major news publications in Pakistan during her career.

Early life 
Haroon received her education from the Kinnaird College For Women.

Career 
Haroon started her career with The Frontier Post as a writer in 1990 while she was still a student. After her graduation, she worked for The Frontier Post regularly as their magazine editor. Haroon later joined The Nation as an editor and reporter.

In 2007, she joined as the editor for the Lahore edition of The News International. Haroon also helped launch Waqt News TV channel and she worked as its news director.

Personal life 
She was married to Dr. Faisal Bari, economist and professor at Lahore University of Management Sciences (LUMS).

Death 
She was diagnosed with cancer at the age of 42. She received initial treatment at Shaukat Khanum Cancer Hospital. Later, her family shifted her to the Mount Sinai Hospital in New York. She lost her battle to cancer and died on February 3, 2013, in New York. Haroon was laid to rest in Lahore. She was survived by her mother and two brothers.

Arif Nizami, former editor of The Nation, stated that Haroon was very helpful to her juniors and co-workers. “She was a brave person and a sincere friend,” he said. Huma Ali, a senior journalist and a former president of the Lahore Press Club, said that "she would never refuse anyone seeking her help or guidance in professional matters.” Investigative reporter Umar Cheema said Haroon was a great journalist and charismatic editor who mentored a generation of young journalists.

Awards and accolades 
The President of Pakistan posthumously awarded Haroon the Pride of Performance on 23 March 2015.

References 

1977 births
2013 deaths
Deaths from cancer in Pakistan
Kinnaird College for Women University alumni
Pakistani journalists
Recipients of the Pride of Performance